The Girl From Outback is a 1911 Australian film. It was called "a thrilling story of real Australian bush life". It starred "actors and actresses who are experts in their art."

It is a lost film.

References

External links
The Girl from Outback at IMDb

Australian black-and-white films
1911 films
Lost Australian films
Australian silent feature films